Elias Albert "Bill" Warne (21 August 1914 – 26 February 1945) was an  Australian rules footballer who played with Fitzroy in the Victorian Football League (VFL).

Notes

External links 
		

1914 births
1945 deaths
Australian rules footballers from Victoria (Australia)
Fitzroy Football Club players
Old Scotch Football Club players